Bakersfield is the primary village and a census-designated place (CDP) in the town of Bakersfield, Franklin County, Vermont, United States. As of the 2020 census it had a population of 347, out of 1,273 in the entire town of Bakersfield.

The CDP is in southeastern Franklin County, in the center of the town of Bakersfield. Vermont Route 108 is the village Main Street; it leads south  to Jeffersonville and north  to Enosburg Falls.

References 

Populated places in Franklin County, Vermont
Census-designated places in Franklin County, Vermont
Census-designated places in Vermont